Atriplex amnicola, commonly known as river saltbush or swamp saltbush, is a species of shrub in the family Amaranthaceae.   Endemic to Western Australia, it is native to the floodplains of the Murchison and Gascoyne Rivers.

River saltbush is a multi-branched shrub whose form ranges from prostrate to erect.  In ideal conditions it may be up to four metres wide, and the erect form may be up to 2.5 metres high.  The branches of river saltbush spread along the ground, and may layer and take root, especially in the prostrate form.  The leaves are bluish-green and covered in fine silvery hairs.  There is great variation in leaf size and shape, but they are often spear-shaped, and usually between one and three centimetres long.  Male and female flowers are borne on separate plants. Male flowers are a purplish-green colour, and help in clusters at the ends of branches; female flowers usually cluster in the axils between leaves and stems. This is a predominantly dioecious species, with male and female flowers produced on separate individuals. The fruit is a woody case about five millimetres square, each containing a single seed.

River saltbush is very highly salt tolerant, and is used in Australia in the rehabilitation of saline areas.  When grown in saline soil, it has the best long-term survival and growth of any saltbush.  It is also fairly drought tolerant, and tolerates waterlogging well once mature.  It is highly favoured by sheep, and recovers well from grazing.  Studies have shown that the meat of sheep grazed on river saltbush is high in Vitamin E and has high "consumer appeal".  Disadvantages include a low volunteering rate, and difficulties establishing by direct seeding.

See also
 Salinity in Australia

References

External links
 CSIRO Information Sheet: Saltbush lifts sheep meat vitamin content: Meat from sheep which have grazed on saltbush has surprisingly high levels of vitamin E, is leaner and more hydrated than regular lamb and has consumer appeal equal to grain-fed lamb. The vitamin E levels could have animal health benefits while extending the shelf-life and maintaining the fresh red colour of saltbush lamb.
 Summary of CSIRO Scientific Article: Examines the nutritive value and preference by sheep of two native Australian saltbush species, River Saltbush (A. amnicola) and Old Man Saltbush (A. nummularia).

amnicola
Eudicots of Western Australia
Caryophyllales of Australia
Taxa named by Paul G. Wilson
Dioecious plants